Christopher Morgan (June 4, 1808 – April 3, 1877) was an American attorney and politician from Auburn, New York.  He was most notable for his service as a member of the  United States House of Representatives from 1839 to 1843.

Early life
Morgan was born in Aurora, New York on June 4, 1808, a son of Christopher Morgan (1777-1834) and Nancy (Barber) Morgan.  He was educated in Cayuga County and attended Yale College, from which he graduated in 1830.

He began to study law with an attorney in Aurora, and completed his studies with Elijah Miller and William H. Seward in Auburn. Morgan was then admitted to the bar and commenced practice in Aurora.

Career
Morgan was elected as a Whig to represent the 24th District in the Twenty-sixth and Twenty-seventh Congresses (March 4, 1839 – March 3, 1843).  After redistricting following the 1840 U.S. Census, Morgan ran for reelection to the Twenty-eighth Congress in the 25th District in 1842, and was defeated by George O. Rathbun.  In the 24th District, Morgan was succeeded by Horace Wheaton.

He moved to Auburn in 1843 and practiced law with Seward and Samuel Blatchford as Morgan, Blatchford & Seward from 1844 to 1847.  He was Secretary of State of New York from 1847 to 1851, which included the additional duty of Superintendent of the New York public schools.  After leaving office he resumed the practice of law in Auburn.

He became a Republican at the party's organization in the mid-1850s.  He served as mayor of Auburn from 1860 to 1861, and was a Trustee of the State lunatic asylum in Utica, New York.

Death and burial
Morgan died in Auburn on April 3, 1877.  He was buried at Fort Hill Cemetery in Auburn.

Family
In 1832, Morgan married Mary Elizabeth Pitney (1813-1893) of Auburn.  They were the parents of a son who did not live to adulthood and three daughters: Cornelia Louise (b. 1834), the wife of C. Eugene Barber; Mary Elizabeth (b. 1835), the wife of William C. Barber; Joseph Pitney (1839-1841); and Frances Adelaide Morgan (b. 1841), the wife of William Beasley Benson.

Morgan was the brother of Edwin Barber Morgan and nephew of Noyes Barber.

References

External links

1808 births
1877 deaths
American politicians with disabilities
Secretaries of State of New York (state)
Mayors of places in New York (state)
New York (state) lawyers
Yale College alumni
New York (state) Republicans
Burials in New York (state)
Whig Party members of the United States House of Representatives from New York (state)
19th-century American politicians
19th-century American lawyers